Ampombiantambo is a small town in Ramena commune, in the region of Diana in northern Madagascar, near Mount Ambohitra. It is approximately 70 kilometres south-east of Antsiranana.

Populated places in Diana Region